Opyl is a Melbourne-based company listed on the Australian Securities Exchange that applies artificial intelligence to improving clinical trial efficiencies. The company has two key platforms: Opin (www.opin.ai) a global clinical trial recruitment platform and service as well as TrialKey a Saas software as a service platform that predicts and designs optimized clinical trial protocols (plans), reducing risk of failure and improving a return on investment in new and emerging medicines, devices, and diagnostics..

Founded in 2013 in California under the name ShareRoot, its initial digital mar tech platforms provided the ability to search for and source User-Generated Content (UGC) from Instagram and Twitter by requesting and obtaining a license and release from the content's owner.

ShareRoot acquired The Social Science, an Australian STEMM specialist digital marketing agency in April 2018. Co-founded by Michelle Gallaher, Michelle joined the ShareRoot team after the acquisition. In March 2019, Michelle became CEO of ShareRoot recalibrating the strategy to focus predominantly on building digital and AI-enabled tools for the global healthcare sector. 

Before going public in 2016, ShareRoot had previously participated in 500 Startups batch 8 and raised a round of angel investing.

ShareRoot was rebranded to Opyl in 2020 to work on technology to support the health and life sciences sector.

Opyl launched its first AI-enabled digital health platform Opin.ai in May 2020.  Opin is a global clinical trial recruitment platform that leverages social media to find, engage with and recruit participants for clinical trials and studies.  Opyl's second AI-enabled platform is TrialKey, a clinical trial protocol design and prediction software (Saas) which is in advanced development.

References

American companies established in 2013
Companies based in Berkeley, California
Technology companies established in 2013